Butter Creek is a  long creek in the U.S. state of Oregon. Butter Creek has a  watershed, and is a tributary of the Umatilla River.

See also
List of Oregon rivers
List of longest streams of Oregon

References

Rivers of Oregon
Rivers of Umatilla County, Oregon
Rivers of Morrow County, Oregon